WMIE-FM (91.5 MHz) is a non-profit FM radio station licensed to Cocoa, Florida, and serving the Melbourne-Titusville-Cocoa, Florida radio market.  The station is currently owned by National Christian Network, Inc.

WMIE-FM airs a mix of Christian talk and teaching and Contemporary Christian music.  National religious leaders heard on WMIE-FM include David Jeremiah, Charles Stanley and Adrian Rogers, as well as local ministers.

WMIE-FM has its studios, offices and transmitter are on West King Street in Cocoa.  WMIE-FM also has an FM translator in Cocoa Beach, W272BA at 102.3 MHz.

In December 1984, the station first signed on the air.

References

External links

MIE-FM